41 of the 50 states have an intermediate appellate court, and nine (Delaware, Maine, Montana, New Hampshire, Rhode Island, South Dakota, Vermont, West Virginia and Wyoming) do not.

Some of the states that do have intermediate appellate courts have more than one, such as Alabama, which has one intermediate appellate court for civil matters and another for criminal, and Pennsylvania, with a Superior Court and a Commonwealth Court which are both appellate courts but with different subject-matter jurisdictions.

Of the states with intermediate appellate courts, some have many divisions with varying degrees of independence from each other.

State intermediate appellate courts

References

External links

List
Appellate Courts, intermediate